Mathia (Greek: Μαθία or Μαθιά) may refer to several villages in Greece:

Mathia, Heraklion, a village in the Heraklion regional unit
Mathia, Messenia, a village in Messenia

Mathia may also refer to food or cooking ingredients:
 Mathia, a flour, similar to peasemeal, made of peas and lentils
 Mathri, an Indian snack
 Mathia (film), a 2004 Indian film
Mathia may also refer to:

 MATHia, educational software developed by Carnegie Learning